Rathdrum may refer to:

 Rathdrum, Idaho, United States
Rathdrum Prairie, the prairie on which Rathdrum, Idaho is located
 Rathdrum, County Wicklow, Ireland